The M79 is a short metropolitan route in Johannesburg, South Africa. On physical street signs, it is signposted as the M12 on the eastern part of the route.

Route 
The M79 begins at a junction with the M77 in the Jabavu suburb of Soweto, heading eastwards as Zulu Drive. It passes through the Dube and Phefeni suburbs to reach a junction with the M10 Road (Klipspruit Valley Road) and cross into the suburb of Orlando East. It becomes Sofasunke Road and continues eastwards to enter the Diepkloof suburb, where it becomes Ben Naude Street and intersects with the M83 Road (Immunk Drive).

The M79 continues eastwards, becoming Rand Show Road, to exit Soweto and form an interchange with the N1 Highway (Johannesburg Western Bypass; which goes north to Roodepoort and Randburg) and the N12 Highway (Johannesburg Southern Bypass; which goes eastwards to Alberton). It continues eastwards, forming the northern boundary of the Aeroton industrial area, to end at a junction with the M5 Road (Nasrec Road) just south of FNB Stadium in Nasrec.

References 

Streets and roads of Johannesburg
Metropolitan routes in Johannesburg